A computational model uses computer programs to simulate and study complex systems using an algorithmic or mechanistic approach and is widely used in a diverse range of fields spanning from physics, chemistry and biology to economics, psychology, cognitive science and computer science. 

The system under study is often a complex nonlinear system for which simple, intuitive analytical solutions are not readily available. Rather than deriving a mathematical analytical solution to the problem, experimentation with the model is done by adjusting the parameters of the system in the computer, and studying the differences in the outcome of the experiments.  Operation theories of the model can be derived/deduced from these computational experiments.

Examples of common computational models are weather forecasting models, earth simulator models, flight simulator models, molecular protein folding models, and neural network models.

See also 
 Computational cognition
Reversible computing
 Agent-based model
 Artificial neural network
 Computational linguistics
 Computational human modeling
 Decision field theory
  Dynamical systems model of cognition
 Membrane computing
 Ontology (information science)
 Programming language theory
 Microscale and macroscale models

References

Models of computation
Mathematical modeling